The Heavenly Body is a 1944 American romantic comedy film directed by Alexander Hall and starring William Powell and Hedy Lamarr. Based on a story by Jacques Théry, with a screenplay by Michael Arlen and Walter Reisch, the film is about the beautiful wife of a professional astronomer who becomes convinced that her astrologer's prediction that she will meet her true love will come true. Produced by Arthur Hornblow Jr., The Heavenly Body was released by Metro-Goldwyn-Mayer in the United States on March 23, 1944.

Plot
A neglected wife turns to an astrologer, who tells her she will meet and fall in love with a handsome stranger, much to the dismay of her astronomer husband.

Cast

Production notes
 Production Dates: 4 May-early Aug 1943
 The working title of this film was The Stars Can Wait. 
 The Heavenly Body marked William Powell's first picture since the 1942 film Crossroads. Crossroads was also the first time in which Powell co-starred with Hedy Lamarr, and according to modern sources, the success of that film prompted MGM to re-team them in The Heavenly Body.

External links
 
 
 
 

1944 films
1944 romantic comedy films
1940s screwball comedy films
American black-and-white films
American romantic comedy films
American screwball comedy films
Films directed by Alexander Hall
Films scored by Bronisław Kaper
Metro-Goldwyn-Mayer films
Films with screenplays by Irving Brecher
Films with screenplays by Harry Kurnitz
1940s English-language films
1940s American films